Sangtar Heer, more commonly known as just Sangtar, is a Punjabi singer, music composer, songwriter and poet. He has written songs and made music for many singers such as Kamal Heer, Manmohan Waris and Debi Makhsoospuri. His older brother Manmohan Waris and younger brother Kamal Heer are both Punjabi Pop\Folk singers.

Discography

Compilations/Live

Albums composed

Songs written

"Gidhe Vich Nachdi"
"Lai Gaee Kalja"
"Akhian De Vanaj"
"Laare Laa Ke"
"Do Jugtaan"
"Rang Na Vata Laeen"
"Thumke Te Thumka"
"India Salaama Karda"
"Hath Hath Mein"
"Lakh Patla Jiha"
"Gaune Da Ghar Doore"
"Kar Hi Tamasha Dekhe"
"Mar Gae Majajne"
"Vasde Raho Pardesio"
"Sare Hi Trucka Vale Ne"
"Mul Morta"
"Nashedi Dil"
"Dhol Vajda Riha"
"Dil Te Na Laeen"
"Dhian Rukh Te Pani"
"Load Chakna"

Videography

Filmography

Producer
 Red Dog Diary: A Dogumentary (2010)

Cinematographer
 Red Dog Diary: A Dogumentary (2010) (Co-Cinematographer)

Sound department
 Tales from Beyond (2004) (Sound Effects Editor)
 Dirty Love (2005) (Sound Editor)
 I Tried (2007) (Sound Editor)

Live performances
In August 2003 he appeared at Shaunki Mela 2003, a Special Tribute Concert for Dhadi Amar Singh Shaunki, with his two brothers.

The three brothers tour every year
 Punjabi Virsa 2004
 Punjabi Virsa 2005
 Punjabi Virsa 2006
 Punjabi Virsa 2007
 Punjabi Virsa 2008
 Punjabi Virsa 2009
 Punjabi Virsa 2010
 Punjabi Virsa 2011
 Punjabi Virsa 2012
 Punjabi Virsa 2014
 Punjabi Virsa 2014
 Punjabi Virsa 2015
 Punjabi Virsa 2016
 Punjabi Virsa 2017

Awards and nominations

References

External links
 
 Plasma Records Website

1973 births
Living people
Bhangra (music)
Indian male singer-songwriters
Indian singer-songwriters
Indian Sikhs
Punjabi-language poets
Punjabi Virsa
Waris Brothers
Singers from Punjab, India
Indian folk-pop singers
21st-century Indian singers
21st-century Indian male singers